Bulltown may refer to:

Bulltown, Ontario, Canada, an unincorporated hamlet now known as Laskay, Ontario
Bulltown, New Jersey, an unincorporated community in Burlington County
Bulltown, West Virginia, a former settlement in Braxton County
Battle of Bulltown, a Civil War skirmish fought near Bulltown, West Virginia